is a Japanese voice actress from Saitama, Japan. Her name is sometimes misread as Ami Higasayama.

Filmography
Aquarion as Tsugumi Rosenmeier
Best Student Council as Miiko Mikawa (eps 1,2)
Boogiepop Phantom as Megumi Toyama
Futakoi as Boy (ep 5)
Genshiken as ComiFes staff (ep 10); Female registerer (ep 2); Female student council member (ep 11); Okada (ep 9); Saleswoman (ep 1); Waitress (ep 7)
Haibane Renmei as Child; Haibane of Abandoned Factory
Jyu Oh Sei as Girl (ep 2)
NieA 7 as Waitress
Otogi Zoshi as Village girl (ep 2)
Pani Poni Dash! as Otome Akiyama
Project Blue Earth SOS as Margaret
Psychic Academy as Myuu
Tactical Roar as Sakura Sasahara
To Heart - Remember my memories as Child A (ep 3)

References

Living people
Japanese voice actresses
Voice actresses from Saitama Prefecture
Year of birth missing (living people)